The enzyme D-dopachrome decarboxylase catalyzes the chemical reaction

D-dopachrome  5,6-dihydroxyindole + CO2

This enzyme belongs to the family of lyases, specifically the carboxy-lyases, which cleave carbon-carbon bonds.  The systematic name of this enzyme class is D-dopachrome carboxy-lyase (5,6-dihydroxyindole-forming). Other names in common use include phenylpyruvate tautomerase II, D-tautomerase, D-dopachrome tautomerase, and D-dopachrome carboxy-lyase.

References

 
 
 
 

EC 4.1.1
Enzymes of unknown structure